Brumoides septentrionis is a species of lady beetle in the family Coccinellidae. It is found in North America.

Subspecies
These three subspecies belong to the species Brumoides septentrionis:
 Brumoides septentrionis davisi (Leng, 1908)
 Brumoides septentrionis hogei (Gorham, 1894)
 Brumoides septentrionis septentrionis (Weise, 1885)

References

Further reading

 

Coccinellidae
Articles created by Qbugbot
Beetles described in 1885